Robert William Smith (December 6, 1912 – September 5, 1994) was an American football, basketball, and baseball coach. He served as the head football coach (1946–1947) and head men's basketball coach (1935–1942) at Furman University.

In 1950, Smith joined the Clemson Tigers football team as an assistant coach under Frank Howard.  He later served was the head baseball coach from 1952 to 1957. In his role as Head Baseball Coach at Clemson University, he was named Atlantic Coast Conference Outstanding Coach of 1954.

His wife, Catherine Hampton Jordan Smith, was the first female mayor of Clemson, South Carolina.

Head coaching record

Football

Baseball

References

External links
 

1912 births
1994 deaths
American football halfbacks
American men's basketball players
Basketball coaches from Georgia (U.S. state)
Basketball players from Georgia (U.S. state)
Clemson Tigers baseball coaches
Clemson Tigers football coaches
Furman Paladins baseball players
Furman Paladins football coaches
Furman Paladins football players
Furman Paladins men's basketball coaches
Furman Paladins men's basketball players
Jacksonville Naval Air Station Flyers football coaches
People from Cartersville, Georgia
Sportspeople from the Atlanta metropolitan area